The 2013 PSL Grand Prix was the second tournament of the Philippine Super Liga for its maiden season. It was held from November 10, 2013 to December 14, 2013.  For this conference (women's), each team was allowed to include two import players in the line up. The TMS-Philippine Army Lady Troopers clinched the women's championship, thereby winning all two conferences of the 2013 PSL season.

A men's division was also introduced with the PLDT myDSL Speed Boosters emerging as the first men's champions.

Women's division

Classification round

|}

|}

Playoffs

Quarterfinals

|}

Semi-finals

|}

5th place

|}

3rd place

|}

Women's Finals

|}

Final standing

Men's division

Classification round

|}

|}

Playoffs

Semi-finals

|}

3rd place

|}

Men's Finals

|}

Final standing

Awards

Venues
Filoil Flying V Arena
Ynares Sports Arena

Broadcast partner
Solar Sports

References

Philippine Super Liga
PSL
PSL